Elbert Bertram Haltom Jr. (December 26, 1922 – October 12, 2003) was a United States district judge of the United States District Court for the Northern District of Alabama.

Education and career

Born in Florence, Alabama, Haltom  was in the United States Army Air Corps as a Sergeant and Air Crew Gunner during World War II, from 1943 to 1945. He received a Bachelor of Laws from the University of Alabama School of Law in 1948. He was in private practice in Florence from 1948 to 1980. He was a member of the Alabama House of Representatives from 1954 to 1958, and of the Alabama Senate from 1958 to 1962.

Federal judicial service

On January 10, 1980, Haltom was nominated by President Jimmy Carter to a new seat on the United States District Court for the Northern District of Alabama created by 92 Stat. 1629. He was confirmed by the United States Senate on May 29, 1980, and received his commission on May 30, 1980. He assumed senior status on December 31, 1991, serving in that capacity until his death on October 12, 2003, in Florence.

References

Sources
 

1922 births
2003 deaths
People from Florence, Alabama
Judges of the United States District Court for the Northern District of Alabama
United States district court judges appointed by Jimmy Carter
20th-century American judges
United States Army Air Forces personnel of World War II
University of Alabama School of Law alumni
Members of the Alabama House of Representatives
Alabama state senators